This is the discography of American recording artist Everlast.

Studio albums

Singles

As featured artist

Other appearances

Studio appearances 
Gravesend (1997) - "Some Nights (Are Better Than Others)"
Big Daddy (1999) - "Only Love Can Break Your Heart"
Black Mask (soundtrack) (1999) - "Painkillers"
End of Days (1999) - "So Long"
Black & White (2000) - "Life's A Bitch"
Soul Assassins II (2000) - "Razor to Your Throat"
Loud Rocks (2000) - "Shook Ones Part II"
Stimulated, Vol. 1 (2000) - "Shroomz Pt. II" with Xzibit
Stimulated, Vol. 1 (2000) - "Laugh Now" with B-Real
Ali (2001) - "The Greatest"
Saving Grace (2007) - "Saving Grace"

Remixes 

 Rhyme Syndicate - Comin' Through (Various) (1988) - "Syndication"
Soulbeat 7 (Various) (1990) - "I Got the Knack (Remix)"
King of the Jungle (2000) - "Love for Real (Remix)" feat. N'Dea Davenport

Selected guest appearances
 Ice-T - "What Ya Wanna Do?" (The Iceberg, 1989)
 Tairrie B - "Vinnie Tha' Moocha" (Power of a Woman, 1990)
 Bronx Style Bob - "Ode II Junior" (Grandma's Ghost, 1992)
 The Whooliganz - "Hit the Deck" ("Put Your Handz Up" (single), 1993)
 Madonna - "Waiting (Remix)" ("Rain" (maxi-single), 1993)
 Nice & Smooth - "Save the Children" (Jewel of the Nile, 1993)
 Lordz of Brooklyn - "Gravesend (Lake of Fire)" (Gravesend (soundtrack), 1997)
 KoЯn - "Freak on a Leash (Lethal Freak Mix)" ("Freak on a Leash" (single), 1998)
 Swollen Members - "Bottle Rocket" (Balance, 1999)
 Prince Paul - "The Bust"; "Men on Blue" (A Prince Among Thieves, 1999)
 Mobb Deep - "Shook Ones, Pt. 2" (cover) (Loud Rocks, 2000)
 Cypress Hill - "(Rock) Superstar" (Skull & Bones, 2000)
 SX-10 - "Rhyme in the Chamber" (Mad Dog American, 2000)
 Dilated Peoples - "Ear Drums Pop (Remix)" (The Platform, 2000)
 DJ Muggs - "Razor to Your Throat" (Soul Assassins II, 2000)
Run-DMC - "Take the Money and Run" (Crown Royal, 2001)
 Kurupt - "Kuruption!" (Space Boogie: Smoke Oddessey, 2001)
 Limp Bizkit - "Faith/Fame Remix" (New Old Songs, 2001)
 Hesher - "Whose Generation" (Hesher, 2001)
 The X-Ecutioners - "B-Boy Punk Rock 2001" (Built from Scratch, 2002)
 Lordz of Brooklyn - "Sucker M.C.'s"; "Lake of Fire (Remix)" (Graffiti Roc, 2003)
 DJ Muggs - "Gone for Good" (Dust, 2003)
 DJ Muggs - "Everlast (Muggs mashup)" (Dust, 2004)
 Sick of It All - "Just Look Around (House of Pain Remix)" (Outtakes for the Outcast, 2004) (recorded in 1993)
 Danny Diablo - "Rise Above" (Street CD Vol. 2, 2005)
 The S.T.O.P. Movement - "Down Wit Us", "Dear Mr. President" (Hard Truth Soldiers, Volume 1, 2006)
 B-Real - "Flash Kharma"; "Family Ties (Remix)" (The Gunslinger Part II: Fist Full of Dollars, 2006)
The Lordz - "The Brooklyn Way" (The Brooklyn Way, 2006)
 Swollen Members - "Put Me On" (Black Magic, 2006)
 Snoop Dogg - "My Medicine" (Ego Trippin', 2008)
 Ill Bill - "Only Time Will Tell", "Pain Gang" (The Hour of Reprisal, 2008)
 Swollen Members - "Dumb" (Armed to the Teeth, 2009)
 Danny Diablo - "Sex & Violence" (International Hardcore Superstar, 2009)
 Cypress Hill - "Take My Pain" (Rise Up, 2010)
 DJ Muggs - "Skull & Guns" (Kill Devil Hills, 2010)
 Slaine - "The Last Song" (A World with No Skies, 2010)
 Big B - "Before I Leave This Place" (Good Times & Bad Advice, 2010)
 Adil Omar - "Hand Over Your Guns" (The Mushroom Cloud Effect, 2013)
 Death! Death! Die! - "Smoked Out Clit" ("Big Fucking Mega Boat", 2013)
 Busta Rhymes - "Calm Down 3.0" (Calm Down: The Clash EP, 2014)
 Ryu - "Who's Next (Move)" (Tanks For The Memories, 2016)
 Slaine Vs Termanology - "Anti-Hero" (Anti-Hero, 2017)
 Statik Selektah - "Shake Em Up" (8, 2017)
 Ras Kass - "The Long Way" (Soul On Ice 2, 2019)
Berner & B-Real - "Just Breathe", "Island Vibes" (Los Meros, 2020)

Unreleased 
 Tom Clancy's Ghost Recon Advanced Warfighter (2006) - "All Along the Watchtower" (as Erik Schrody)

References

Discographies of American artists
Hip hop discographies